Sant Martí (the Catalan form of Saint Martin) may refer to the following places in Catalonia, Spain:

Sant Martí (district), a district of Barcelona
Sant Martí (Barcelona Metro), a railway station
Sant Martí, Biure, a church located in the municipality of Sagàs
Sant Martí de Llémena, a municipality in the province of Girona
Sant Martí de Provençals, a neighborhood in the Sant Martí district of Barcelona
Sant Martí de Riucorb, a municipality in the Province of Lleida
Sant Martí de Tous, a municipality in the comarca of Anoia
Sant Martí d'Empúries, a municipality in the comarca of Alt Empordà
Sant Martí Sarroca, a municipality in the comarca of Alt Penedès
Sant Martí Sesgueioles, a municipality in the comarca of Anoia
Sant Martí Vell, a village in the province of Girona

See also
 Saint Martin (disambiguation)